Michael Coorey (born 16 May 1975) is a former professional Lebanon international rugby league footballer in the 1990s and 2000s. Primarily a er, he played for the North Queensland Cowboys and Brisbane Broncos in the National Rugby League.

Background
Born in Warwick, Queensland, Coorey, who is of Lebanese descent, played his junior rugby league for the Warwick Collegians before being signed by the North Queensland Cowboys.

Playing career
In 1994, Coorey represented the Queensland under-19 team and the Junior Kangaroos.

In Round 11 of the 1996 ARL season, Coorey made his first grade debut in the Cowboys' 26–10 win over the Newcastle Knights. In Round 13, he scored his first try in a 16–18 loss to the Sydney Tigers. In 1998, after not playing first grade in 1997, Coorey played seven NRL games for the Cowboys. 

In 1999, Coorey played for the Cairns Cyclones in the Queensland Cup. On 14 November 1999, he made his international debut for Lebanon, scoring two tries in a 24–38 loss to France in the Mediterranean Cup. A week later, he scored a hat-trick in Lebanon's 2000 Rugby League World Cup qualification play-off win over the United States.

In 2000, Coorey joined the Balmain Tigers, the Wests Tigers feeder club, in the NSWRL First Division. Later that year, he represented Lebanon at the 2000 Rugby League World Cup, playing two games and scoring a try in a 22–24 loss to Wales.

In 2001, Coorey joined the Brisbane Broncos. He made his debut for the club in a semi-final win over the St George Illawarra Dragons. During his three years at the Broncos, he played seven games, playing predominantly for the Toowoomba Clydesdales, their Queensland Cup feeder club. In 2002, he again represented Lebanon at the Mediterranean Cup. In 2003, he represented the Queensland Residents, scoring a try in their 36–12 win over New South Wales.

Statistics

ARL/NRL

International

References

1975 births
Living people
Australian rugby league players
Australian people of Lebanese descent
Brisbane Broncos players
Balmain Tigers players
Sportspeople of Lebanese descent
Lebanon national rugby league team players
North Queensland Cowboys players
Rugby league wingers
Rugby league centres
Rugby league halfbacks
Rugby league second-rows
Rugby league players from Queensland